Ghosts of a River (lit. "Three men per square mile") is a Canadian short documentary film, directed by Pierre Patry and Jacques Kasma and released in 1966. The film depicts various ghost towns in British Columbia which have been abandoned in preparation for the construction of hydroelectric dams along the Columbia River.

The film premiered in the Montreal International Film Festival's Festival of Canadian Films lineup in 1966, where it received a special mention from the short film jury. Kasma won the Canadian Film Award for Best Editing at the 19th Canadian Film Awards in 1967.

References

1966 films
1960s French-language films
French-language Canadian films
Films shot in British Columbia
Canadian short documentary films
National Film Board of Canada short films
National Film Board of Canada documentaries
1966 documentary films
1966 short films
1960s Canadian films